Davit Mujiri ( born 2 January 1978) is a Georgian former professional footballer who played as a midfielder.

Mujiri made 26 appearances for the Georgia national football team.

International goals

References

External links

1978 births
Living people
Footballers from Georgia (country)
Expatriate footballers from Georgia (country)
Georgia (country) youth international footballers
Georgia (country) under-21 international footballers
Georgia (country) international footballers
FC Dinamo Tbilisi players
FC Sheriff Tiraspol players
SK Sturm Graz players
PFC Krylia Sovetov Samara players
FC Lokomotiv Moscow players
Sanfrecce Hiroshima players
FC Zestafoni players
Erovnuli Liga players
Moldovan Super Liga players
Austrian Football Bundesliga players
Russian Premier League players
J1 League players
Expatriate footballers in Moldova
Expatriate sportspeople from Georgia (country) in Moldova
Expatriate footballers in Austria
Expatriate sportspeople from Georgia (country) in Austria
Expatriate footballers in Russia
Expatriate sportspeople from Georgia (country) in Russia
Expatriate footballers in Japan
Expatriate sportspeople from Georgia (country) in Japan
Association football midfielders